Open water swimming at the 2008 Asian Beach Games was held from 25 October to 26 October 2008 in Bali, Indonesia.

Medalists

Men

Women

Medal table

Results

Men

5 km
25 October

10 km
26 October

Women

5 km
25 October

10 km
26 October

References
 Official site

2008 Asian Beach Games events
Asian Beach Games
2008